Nils Ove Hellvik (born 25 July 1962) is a Norwegian former professional footballer who as a striker played for Bryne FK and Viking FK. He played 190 games and scored 49 goals for Bryne, and played 215 games and scored 111 goals for Viking between 1983 and 1987. He won five caps for Norway.

External links
 
 

1962 births
Living people
Association football forwards
Norwegian footballers
Norway international footballers
Bryne FK players
Viking FK players
Eliteserien players